= Paleoboa =

Paleoboa Temporal range: Eocene

Scientific classification
- Kingdom: Animalia
- Phylum: Chordata
- Class: Reptilia
- Order: Squamata
- Suborder: Serpentes
- Genus: †Paleoboa; Schmidt, 1927

Extinct genus of snakes

Paleoboa is an extinct genus of snake from the Eocene of Germany.
